The Romaka Siddhanta, literally "The Doctrine of the Romans", is one of the five siddhantas mentioned in Varahamihira's Panchasiddhantika which is an Indian astronomical treatise.

Content
It is the only one of all Indian astronomical works which is based on the tropical system. It was considered one of "The Five Astronomical Canons" in India in the 5th century.

See also
Paulisa Siddhanta
Indian science and technology
Indian mathematics
Indian astronomy

Notes

References

 Sarma, Nataraja (2000), "Diffusion of Astronomy in the Ancient World", Endeavour, 24 (2000): 157-164.

Astronomy books
Hindu astronomy
Mathematics manuscripts
5th-century books
Hindu astrological texts
Indian astronomy texts
Ancient Indian astronomical worksa